Ruddy Rosario Rodríguez de Lucía (born March 20, 1967), a former Miss Venezuela World, is an actress, model and businesswoman. Born in Caracas, Venezuela, daughter of Venezuelan Pedro José Rodríguez and Italian Rita de Lucía. She has a brother Romano and a sister Rina.  She represented Venezuela in the 1985 Miss World pageant in England where she placed in the top seven.

Career
She made four calendars (1992, 1993, 1994 and 1995), being the first Venezuelan actress whose calendars were sold in other countries: Ecuador, Peru, Colombia and Russia.

Business
She once promoted a line of swim suits. Rodríguez is now promoting her own line of cosmetics. She has opened five stores: two in Caracas, one in Valencia, one in Ciudad Guayana and one in Bogotá known as "Ruddy Rodríguez Cosmetics".  More stores are planned for Venezuela, Colombia, Ecuador and Miami.

Television
Ruddy Rodríguez is a popular actress in telenovelas (Latin American TV soap opera) and TV special series.

Theater
Before entering 1985 Miss Venezuela, Rodríguez performed small theater roles.

Since 1999 she has performing a monologue: "Una mujer con suerte" (A Lucky Woman), written by her brother Romano. This monologue has been presented in Venezuela, Colombia, Panama, Miami, Argentina, Ecuador. She hopes to translate this monologue into English in the future.

Hollywood
Rodríguez had a short appearance (45 seconds) in the 1987 James Bond film: The Living Daylights.

Twenty years of artistic career
Because of Ruddy Rodríguez's 20 years of artistic career, a party in her honor was organized at the Gavanna Night Club in Bogotá, Colombia on July 12, 2006. There were about 200 invitees from Colombia, Venezuela and Miami; at this party, she stated that her career as a telenovela actress was coming to an end in September 2006 after the taping of the last episode of the Colombian telenovela "La Ex" ( "The Ex," or, "The Former Wife") was filmed. But after that date, she has since filmed several more telenovelas.

Personal life
Although Rodríguez was born in Anaco, she grew up in Caracas where at the age of 15 she had her first boyfriend, her first kiss.

In 1985 after the Miss World Beauty Contest, she insisted on traveling to Italy to know her grandfather. She traveled with her brother Romano to Savinno, Naples in Italy and met their grandfather. Before their return, her grandfather said to her: porta a mia mamma perche io parto ad un lungo viaggio (Bring your mother, because I am going in a long trip), Ruddy went back to Venezuela, worked in her first telenovela, saved enough money and together with her mother Rita visited Italy again, stayed for 15 days and celebrated Ruddy's grandfather's 96th birthday. He died in peace the next day.

In July 1995 she married to Rodolfo Pisani, a Venezuelan lawyer. They separated in 2005 and finally divorced on July 3, 2006, after more than ten years of marriage.

After a decade of being just friends, since November 2006 actress Ruddy Rodríguez lived a romance with Colombian rejoneador Juan Rafael Restrepo Bello, whom she married on October 1, 2011, in Colombia. On September 1, 2014, they separated "by mutual agreement", and got divorced January 23, 2015.

Because Ruddy and her sister Rina are look-alikes, when Rina was pregnant, many people mistakenly talked about Ruddy Rodríguez pregnancy.

Scientology
Since 2000, Ruddy Rodríguez has been a dedicated Scientologist.

She is an active member of the Fundación "El camino a la felicidad" (The Way to Happiness Foundation International), which promotes the booklet "The way to happiness", written by the founder of the Church of Scientology: L. Ronald Hubbard.

Telenovelas and TV series

Filmography

References

External links

Ruddy Rodríguez in VenCOR
Ruddy Rodríguez bio and galleries

1967 births
Living people
Miss Venezuela World winners
Miss World 1985 delegates
People from Anzoátegui
Venezuelan businesspeople
20th-century Venezuelan women singers
Venezuelan film actresses
Venezuelan musical theatre actresses
Venezuelan Scientologists
Venezuelan telenovela actresses
Venezuelan people of Italian descent
20th-century Venezuelan actresses
21st-century Venezuelan actresses